Praktichi is a rural locality (a selo) and the administrative center of Praktichansky Selsoviet of Mazanovsky District, Amur Oblast, Russia. The population was 385 as of 2018. There are 5 streets.

Geography 
Praktichi is located 92 km west of Novokiyevsky Uval (the district's administrative centre) by road. Novonikolsk is the nearest rural locality.

References 

Rural localities in Mazanovsky District